The Coroner's Court for west London is located at Bagleys Lane, Fulham. The court covers the London boroughs of Hillingdon, Ealing, Hounslow, Richmond, Kingston and Hammersmith & Fulham.

References

Fulham
Coroner's courts in London